Kennedy Okonkwo (born 12 October 1977) is a Nigerian businessman, philanthropist, and real-estate entrepreneur. He is the founder and CEO of Nedcomoaks Limited.

Early life and education 
Kennedy hails from Ojoto, Anambra State. Kennedy was born and raised in Lagos, Nigeria, where he had his primary and secondary school education. Kennedy attended the University of Ibadan, where he obtained a Bachelor of Science (BSc) in Psychology and the Lagos State University, where he obtained his Masters in Business Administration.

Career and philanthropy 
In 2007, Kennedy founded Nedcomoaks Limited, a Real Estate company with zero capital. He is the founder of the Kennedy Okonkwo Programme For Tech Entrepreneurs. Kennedy is the sponsor of the Eti Osa community Oba's cup.

Personal life 
Kennedy is married to Ichechi Okonkwo. He lives in Lagos, Nigeria with his wife and children.

Awards and recognition 
 Peace Legend Icon of the Year 2019
 African Achievers Award - Excellence in Enterprise and Business Innovation 2019
 Entrepreneur of the Year - Nigerian Entrepreneurs Award 2018
 African Business Personality of the Year 2017

References

Living people
1977 births
People from Anambra State
Nigerian philanthropists
Nigerian businesspeople
Nigerian billionaires
20th-century Nigerian businesspeople
21st-century Nigerian businesspeople
Nigerian Christians
Nigerian company founders